Ferrantino Malatesta (1258 – 12 November 1353) was a lord of Rimini and several other lands in northern Italy, a member of the Malatesta family.

He was the son of Malatestino dell'Occhio, becoming lord in Rimini after the death of the latter's brother Pandolfo I. Ferrantino had been previously podestà of Bologna, Florence Padua, Forlì, Cesena and other cities.

In 1330 he was banned from Rimini by the Papal legate, through the intrigues of his uncle Malatesta Guastafamiglia of Pesaro. Ferrantino ruled again briefly from 1334 to 1335, when he was imprisoned by Guastafamiglia.

He died in Rimini in 1353.

References

1258 births
1353 deaths
Ferrantino
13th-century condottieri
Lords of Rimini
14th-century condottieri